Carlo Broglia (1552–1617) was a Roman Catholic prelate who served as Archbishop of Turin (1592–1617).

Biography
Carlo Broglia was born in Chieri, Italy, on 16 September 1552.
On 20 November 1592, he was appointed during the papacy of Pope Clement VIII as Archbishop of Turin.
On 30 November 1592, he was consecrated bishop by Agostino Valier, Bishop of Verona. 
He served as Archbishop of Turin until his death on 8 February 1617.

References

External links and additional sources
 (for Chronology of Bishops) 
 (for Chronology of Bishops) 

16th-century Italian Roman Catholic bishops
17th-century Italian Roman Catholic bishops
Bishops appointed by Pope Clement VIII
1552 births
1617 deaths